The 1904–05 season was the 6th soccer season for FC Barcelona.

Events
Barcelona becomes champion of Catalonia for the first time.

Squad

Results 

 1. Game with extended 15 minutes.
 2. Opening the field of Muntaner.

External links

References

FC Barcelona seasons
Barcelona